Rydal is a locality situated in Mark Municipality, Västra Götaland County, Sweden. It had 402 inhabitants in 2010.

References 

Populated places in Västra Götaland County
Populated places in Mark Municipality